The following is a listing of fictional characters from the HBO series, The Wire. Note that some characters' allegiances or positions may have changed over time; and, although the series has ended, the placement below is generally meant to reflect their most recent situation. Also, some specific plot lines may be revealed in a character's description.

Appearances

The Law

Law enforcement is an integral part of The Wire and characters in this field range from those enforcing the law at street level to those setting laws citywide.

The Street

Those involved in drug dealing and drug addicts alike are featured. Thieves and sex workers are also featured.

The Docks

Stevedores, their families, and the criminal organization that is involved in the smuggling through the Baltimore docks are featured.

The Politicians

Both honest and corrupt state and city officials depicted in the series are included in this section.

The Schools

Pupils, staff and employees in the school system are featured.

The Paper

The fifth season features an examination of a fictionalized version of The Baltimore Sun and introduced several journalist characters.

A to Z

A
Aimee
Artis, Anton "Stinkum"
Asher, Jimmy

B
Bailey, John
Baker, Brian
Barksdale, Avon
Barksdale, Brianna
Barksdale, D'Angelo
Barlow, Frank
Ben-Eleazer, Eton
Bernard
Bell, Russell "Stringer"
"Big Guy"
"Big Roy"
Blocker, Wendell "Orlando"
Bond, Rupert
Bratton, Savino
Brice, De'Londa
Brice, Namond
Brice, Roland "Wee-Bey"
Broadus, Preston "Bodie"
Brown, Bobby
Brother Mouzone
"Bubbles"
Burrell, Ervin
Butchie

C
Campbell, Nerese
Cantrell, Walter
Carcetti, Jen
Carcetti, Thomas "Tommy"
Carr, Malik "Poot"
Carver, Ellis
Castor, Aaron
Cheryl
"Chess"
Christeson
Cole, Ray
Colicchio, Anthony
Colvin, Howard "Bunny"
Country
Cousins, Reginald "Bubbles"
Coxson, Nat
Crutchfield, Michael

D
D'Agostino, Theresa
Daniels, Cedric
Daniels, Marla
Dante
Davis, R. Clayton "Clay"
Dawson, Zenobia
The Deacon
"Dee-Dee"
Delores
Demper, Steven
DiBiago, Bruce
DiPasquale, Gary
Diggins, Claude
Donette
Donnie
"Donut"
Donnelly, Marcia
Dozerman, Kenneth

E

F
Fitzhugh, Terrance "Fitz"
Fletcher, Mike
Foerster, Raymond
Frazier, Warren
Frazier, Randall
Freamon, Lester
"Frog"
"Fruit"

G
Garrick, Lloyd "Truck"
Gerard
Gerry
"Ghost"
Glekas, George a.k.a. "Double G"
Gray, Anthony
"The Greek"
Greggs, Shakima "Kima"
Gutierrez, Alma

H
Hauk, Thomas "Herc"
Haynes, Augustus "Gus"
Hendrix, Ricardo a.k.a. "Fat-Face Rick"
Hilton, Marquis "Bird"
Holley, Vernon
"Hucklebuck"
"Hungry Man"

I
Innes, Shardene

J
Jamal
Judkins, Crystal
Johnson, Herbert De'Rodd a.k.a. "Puddin"

K
Kenard
Kimmy
Klebanow, Thomas
Koutris, Kristos
Krawczyk, Andy

L
"La La"
Lamar
Lambert
Landsman, Jay
Lee, Michael
Lee, Raylene
Levy, Maurice
"Little Big Roy"
"Little Kevin"
"Little Man"
Little, Omar
Luxenberg, Steven

M
Mahon, Patrick
Malatov, Sergei
Manigault, Aaron "Bug"
Manigault, Devar
Marimow, Charles
Massey, Caroline
"Maui"
McArdle, "White" Mike
McGinty, Shaun "Shamrock"
McNulty, Elena
McNulty, Jimmy
McNulty, Michael
McNulty, Sean
Mello, Dennis
Metcalf,"Monk"
Mitchell, Tosha
Moreland, Bunk
Motley, Vernon "Ott"

N
Nathan, Ilene
Norris, Ed

O
"O-Dog"
Old Face Andre

P
Pakusa, Thomas "Horseface"
Parenti, David
Parker, Coleman
Partlow, Chris
Pearlman, Rhonda
Pearson, Felicia "Snoop"
Perkins, Eunetta
Perry
Phelan, Daniel
Phelps, Tim
"Phil-Boy"
Polk, Augustus
Price, Damien Lavelle a.k.a. "Day Day"
Price, Jeff
Pryzbylewski, Roland "Prez"

Q

R
Rawls, William
Reed, Bobby
Renaldo
Reese, Amanda
Rico
"Ronnie Mo"
Royce, Clarence
Russell, Beatrice "Beadie"

S
Sampson, Grace
Santangelo, Michael
Sapper
Sherrod
"Slim Charles"
Sobotka, Frank
Sobotka, Joan
Sobotka, Louis
Sobotka, Nick
Sobotka, Ziggy
Spamanto, Johnny "Fifty"
Spry, Jay
"Squeak"
Stanfield, Marlo
Sterling
Stewart, "Proposition" Joe
Stokes, Albert
Sydnor, Leander

T
Tank
Taylor, Marvin
Templeton, Scott
Tilghman, Dwight
Torret
Twigg, Roger
Tyson, Darnell

U

V
Valchek, Stanislaus
Vinson
Vondopoulos, Spiros "Vondas"

W
Wagstaff, Calvin "Cheese"
Wagstaff, Randy
Wallace
Walker, Eddie
Walon
Watkins, Odell
Weeks, Johnny
Weems, Duquan "Dukie"
Whiting, James
Williams, Karim
Williamson, Kintel
Wilson, Norman
Wise, Dennis "Cutty"
Withers, Claudell
Wright, Brandon

X

Y

Z
Zorzi, Bill

References